Christoph Paulus (April 17, 1852 – April 9, 1915) was a member of the Wisconsin State Assembly during the 1895 and 1915 sessions. He was a Republican. In between, he was Postmaster of the Wisconsin State Senate from 1897 to 1907. Paulus was born on April 17, 1852, in Milwaukee, Wisconsin.

References

Politicians from Milwaukee
Republican Party members of the Wisconsin State Assembly
Wisconsin postmasters
1852 births
1915 deaths